Héctor Rubén Marcos Peralta (6 December 1942, at Osorno, Chile – 14 August 2006, at Osorno), known as Rubén Marcos, was a Chilean football player who played as a midfielder. Usually a central midfielder, he was well known for his versatility and stamina. Capable both in attack and defense, Marcos was also technically skilled and is one of the most highly regarded Chilean midfielders. He died of a heart attack at age 63.

Career
During his career, Marcos played for Universidad de Chile and Palestino in Chile and for Emelec in Ecuador. He also played for the Chile national football team and took part in the 1966 FIFA World Cup (where he scored two goals) and the South American Championship 1967. 

In 1999, he performed as President, interim coach and director of Provincial Osorno.

Honors
Universidad de Chile
 Primera División de Chile (5):  1962, 1964, 1965, 1967, 1969
  (1): 
  (2): 1968, 1969

Chile
  (2): ,

Legacy
Estadio Rubén Marcos Peralta at Osorno was named after him.

References

External links
 
 Rubén Marcos at PartidosdelaRoja 

1942 births
2006 deaths
People from Osorno, Chile
Chilean footballers
Chilean expatriate footballers
Chile international footballers
1966 FIFA World Cup players
1967 South American Championship players
Universidad de Chile footballers
C.S. Emelec footballers
Club Deportivo Palestino footballers
Chilean Primera División players
Ecuadorian Serie A players
Chilean expatriate sportspeople in Ecuador
Expatriate footballers in Ecuador
Association football midfielders
Chilean football managers
Provincial Osorno managers
Primera B de Chile managers